The Top of the World IPC is a biennial international piano competition in Tromsø, Norway. Its first edition took place from June 14–19, 2009 and was won by Mariangela Vacatello.

1st edition - 2009

Jury
  Volker Banfield
  David Dubal
  Roland Keller
  Anne Øland
  Liisa Pohjola
  Alberto Portugheis
  Einar Steen-Nøkleberg
  Tamás Vásáry

Palmares

Competition results, by rounds
 1st Round, June 14–15. University of Tromsø's Conservatory

 2nd Round, June 16–17.
  Charlie Albright
  Julie Coucheron
   Boris Feiner
 **  Yaron Kohlberg
  Kristian Lindberg
  Maria Masycheva
  Evelina Puzaitė
  Mayumi Sakamoto
  Serhiy Salov
  Mariangela Vacatello
  Ilya Yakushev

 Final, June 19.
  Mayumi Sakamoto
  Serhiy Salov
  Mariangela Vacatello

References
  Alink-Argerich Foundation - Competition Results

Tromsø
Piano competitions
Music competitions in Norway